Ammar Ahmad  (born 24 October 1974) is an Iraqi former football forward who played for Iraq at the 2001 FIFA World Youth Championship.

Ahmad made 2 appearances for the national team in 2001.

References

Iraqi footballers
Iraq international footballers
Living people
Association football forwards
1974 births